Trabzonspor is one of the "4 big clubs" in Turkish football. Formed in 1967 through a merger, Trabzonspor's history dates back to two of the clubs, the foundation year of İdmanocağı and İdmangücü. This article tells the story from the foundation of the first clubs in the port city of Trabzon.

History

In the Beginning (1923–1962)
There were four clubs in Trabzon in Early years : İdmanocağı(1921), İdmangücü(1913), Necmiati(1923) and Trabzon Lisesi. All four clubs competed against each other in the Trabzon Amateur Regional League. in 1923, two of the clubs, İdmanocağı and İdmangücü, held a fierce rivalry that was equal to the Fenerbahçe S.K. and Galatasaray S.K. rivalry.

The rivalry reached its peak from 1930 on. İdmanocağı won five titles in a row from 1929 to 1933, with İdmangücü besting the record with seven titles in a row from 1934 to 1940. The league was dominated by Lise for six years, before İdmangücü took back the title in 1947–48. More clubs were being founded in Trabzon at the time, including Doğan Gençlik, Akçaabat Sebatspor, Sürmene Gençlik, Zafer Gençlik, Yolspor, and Yalıspor.

The rivalry between Trabzon İdmanocağı and İdmangücü split Trabzon into two, with one side taking the red and yellows (İdmanocağı), and the other taking the green and whites (İdmangücü). The split frustrated the fans as well as the players, which led to some of Trabzon's biggest talents moving to Ankara and Istanbul to play football. These included Hasan Polat and Ali Polat (Gençlerbirliği), Selim Satıroğlu and Ahmet Karlıklı (Galatasaray), Zekeriya Bali (Fenerbahçe), and Nazmi Bilge (Beşiktaş).

The Merger (1962–1973)
At the start of the 1962–63 season, then president of the TFF, Orhan Şeref Apak, asked cities to combine their football clubs into one representative team, and have them compete in the Milli Lig (Süper Lig). However, due to the rivalry between İdmanocağı and İdmangücü, the city of Trabzon weren't able to merge. City and club officials would meet every morning and night to iron out an agreement, but it never materialized.

Instead, only İdmanocağı, Martıspor, and Yıldızspor merged on 21 June 1966. They began wearing yellow and red kits and competed in the 2.Lig (Second Division). They finished eighth place in their first season, as well as runners-up for the Başbakanlık Kupası. A month later, İdmangücü, Karadenizgücü, Martıspor, and Yolspor merged to form Trabzonspor. Their club colours were red and white.

İdmanocağı opposed the merger and took up a lawsuit against the newly founded Trabzonspor. Ulvi Yenal, head of Physical Education, decided to step in and announce that neither İdmanocağı nor İdmangücü would be accepted into the 2.Lig. This sent a shockwave thru both clubs. Until these two clubs decided to unify into one club, the city of Trabzon would not have a professional representative. In the end, İdmanocağı and İdmangücü decided to merge, along with Karadenizgücü and Martıspor, to become Trabzonspor on 2 August 1967.

Everything was set up, but the club still ran into another roadblock: club colours. The club came to the decision after five meetings with fans and club officials. At first, it was suggested the club should wear the predecessor colours together (yellow-red and green-white), but it was deemed not suitable. It was then suggested that a poll be held, but that was also quickly cast aside. The fans and club officials began to lose patience until TFF General Manager Ulvi Yenal came up with a compromise. He suggested that both clubs, İdmanocağı and İdmangücü, should choose a colour opposite of their own club colours. It was then both clubs came up with maroon and blue.

The Özyazıcı Era (1973–1984)
Ahmet Suat Özyazıcı took over as manager in 1973. Özyazıcı played for İdmanocağı, the precursor club to Trabzonspor. Before Özyazıcı, Trabzonspor languished in the 2.Lig. In his first season in charge, Özyazıcı led Trabzon to the 1.Lig (Süper Lig). The club finished ninth in their first full season in the top-flight. The next season was more successful, as Trabzon finished in first place. They became the first club outside of Istanbul to win the league title.

Under Özyazıcı, Trabzonspor began a spell of dominance. The club did the double during the 1976–77 season, winning the Süper Lig and Türkiye Kupası. They also won the Süper Kupa. After a second-place finish and another Türkiye Kupası win in 1977–78, Özyazıcı was replaced by Özkan Sümer. Sümer won the league and Türkiye Kupası, but was replaced by Özyazıcı the following season. Özyazıcı and Sümer would continue switching posts, with the team winning more titles and cups.

Trabzonspor won a total of 17 trophies in Özyazıcı's most successful period. These 17 trophies included six Süper Lig titles (Özyazıcı - 4, Sümer - 2), three Türkiye Kupası (Özyazıcı - 3, Sümer - 0), six Süper Kupa (Özyazıcı - 4, Sümer - 2), and two Başbakanlık Kupası (Özyazıcı - 2, Sümer - 0). The club also beat then-English champions Liverpool F.C. 1–0 in the first leg of their second round match-up in the 1976–77 European Cup. They went on to lose 0–3 in the second leg.

After Özyazıcı (1984 onwards)
Trabzonspor struggled after Özyazıcı's departure. They would endure a cup drought, with their next win coming in 1992. The club haven't won a league title since Özyazıcı's last title in 1984. However, the club have stayed competitive in the top-flight, finishing third place six times and second place four times.

Their highest finish of the 2000s came in 2003–04. Trabzonspor finished four points behind champions  Fenerbahçe. The club was led by club icons Gökdeniz Karadeniz (14 goals) and Fatih Tekke (11 goals). The club also won the 2003–04 Türkiye Kupası, their second Türkiye Kupası in a row. Their second-place finish admitted them into the second qualifying round of the 2004–05 UEFA Champions League for the first time since their last Süper Lig title in 1983–84. They defeated Latvian club Skonto FC 4–1 on aggregate, but fell to Dynamo Kyiv 3–2 on aggregate after winning the first leg 2–1.

Their UEFA Cup run ended quicker than their Champions League run, falling to Athletic Bilbao 3–4 on aggregate after winning the first leg 3–2. The club finished second again the following season, this time to Galatasaray. They were again led by their two Turkish internationals Karadeniz and Tekke, with Tekke netting a league-high 31 goals that season. Trabzonspor were shocked in the 2005-06 UEFA Champions League second round by minnows Anorthosis Famagusta. They lost the first leg 3–1 in Cyprus, and were unable to recover back in Trabzon.

References

External links
Official website history 

Trabzonspor
Trabzonspor
Sport in Trabzon